Dontrelle Javaar Inman (born January 31, 1989) is an American gridiron football wide receiver for the Toronto Argonauts of the Canadian Football League (CFL). He played college football at Virginia and was signed by the Jacksonville Jaguars of the National Football League (NFL) as an undrafted free agent in 2011. He was a Grey Cup champion with the Argonauts in 2012 and has been a member of several other NFL teams.

Professional career

Toronto Argonauts
In 2012, Inman signed with the Toronto Argonauts of the Canadian Football League. In his rookie CFL season, Inman recorded 50 receptions for 803 yards and five touchdowns. Inman went on to win the 100th Grey Cup with the Argonauts.

In 2013, Inman recorded 50 receptions for 739 yards and six touchdowns. On June 28, 2013, Inman was pressed into punting duties after an injury to starting kicker Swayze Waters during a game against the visiting Hamilton Tiger-Cats. In that game, Inman recorded three punts for a total of 88 yards, yielding a 29.3 yard punting average.

On December 24, 2013, the Argonauts released Inman so he could explore NFL opportunities.

San Diego / Los Angeles Chargers

On January 6, 2014, Inman signed a reserves/futures contract with the San Diego Chargers. In his first preseason game as a Charger, Inman had three receptions for 107 yards against the Dallas Cowboys, including a 70-yard touchdown in the third quarter. Inman secured his spot on the 53-man roster with another impressive performance in his last preseason game, leading receivers with three receptions for 54 yards. Inman caught his first NFL pass on Saturday December 20 against the 49ers, his 17-yard gain helped set up Malcom Floyd’s game-tying touchdown and the Chargers’ eventual win in overtime. Inman had seven catches for 79 yards overall in the victory. In the final game of the 2014 NFL season Inman added 5 receptions for 79 yards. He would finish the season with 12 catches for 158 yards (13.2 yards per catch) in two games.

By the end of the 2015 preseason Inman survived the cuts and made the 53 man roster. On October 4, 2015, against the Cleveland Browns Inman stepped in for the injured Malcom Floyd and caught a clutch 68-yard catch and run. On October 18 against the Green Bay Packers, Inman caught a touchdown with no time left on a fourth down. Inman finished the game with 18 yards and a touchdown playing in for an injured Keenan Allen. A few weeks later, Inman had 5 receptions for 65 yards and 1 touchdown against the Jacksonville Jaguars. Against the Miami Dolphins, Inman had three receptions for 78 yards. The very next week on Christmas Eve against the Oakland Raiders, Inman had eight receptions for 82 yards and scored one touchdown. Inman also saw snaps at safety during that game because the Chargers had run out of safeties due to injuries. Inman finished the 2015 season playing 14 games, recording 35 receptions for 486 yards and scoring three touchdowns.

In 2016, the Chargers picked up Inman's one-year tender for $600,000.

On March 9, 2017, the Chargers placed a second-round tender on Inman. He officially signed his tender on April 25, 2017. On May 20, 2017, it was revealed that Inman underwent core muscle surgery.

Chicago Bears
On October 25, 2017, Inman was traded to the Chicago Bears for a conditional seventh round draft pick.

Indianapolis Colts
On October 16, 2018, Inman was signed by the Indianapolis Colts. After the season, he became a free agent.

New England Patriots
On May 13, 2019, Inman was signed by the New England Patriots. On August 18, 2019, he requested and was granted his release from the Patriots.

Los Angeles Chargers (second stint)
On August 20, 2019, Inman signed with the Los Angeles Chargers. He was placed on injured reserve on October 2, 2019, with a quad injury. He was released on November 25.

Indianapolis Colts (second stint)
On December 10, 2019, Inman signed with the Indianapolis Colts.

Washington Football Team

Inman signed with the Washington Football Team on August 4, 2020. In Week 3 against the Cleveland Browns, he had three receptions for 38 receiving yards and two touchdowns in the 34–20 loss. Inman was waived by the team on December 26, 2020, and re-signed to their practice squad four days later. He was elevated to the active roster on January 2 and January 8, 2021, for the team's week 17 and wild card playoff games against the Philadelphia Eagles and Tampa Bay Buccaneers, and reverted to the practice squad after each game. His practice squad contract with the team expired after the season on January 18, 2021.

Toronto Argonauts (second stint)
The Toronto Argonauts announced on March 1, 2023, that they signed Inman.

NFL career statistics

References

External links
 Toronto Argonauts bio
 Virginia Cavaliers bio 
 

1989 births
African-American players of American football
American football wide receivers
African-American players of Canadian football
Canadian football wide receivers
Jacksonville Jaguars players
Living people
People from Batesburg-Leesville, South Carolina
Players of American football from South Carolina
San Diego Chargers players
Toronto Argonauts players
Virginia Cavaliers football players
Los Angeles Chargers players
Chicago Bears players
Indianapolis Colts players
New England Patriots players
Washington Football Team players
21st-century African-American sportspeople
20th-century African-American people